Nasution Karubaba (born 27 November 1989) is an Indonesian former footballer.

Club statistics

Hounors

Clubs
Persisam Putra Samarinda :
Liga Indonesia Premier Division champions : 1 (2008-09)

References

External links

1989 births
Association football midfielders
Living people
Indonesian footballers
Papuan sportspeople
Liga 1 (Indonesia) players
Persiram Raja Ampat players
Indonesian Premier Division players
Perseman Manokwari players
Persisam Putra Samarinda players